Dacnopilio is a genus of harvestmen in the family Phalangiidae.

Species
 Dacnopilio armatus Roewer, 1911
 Dacnopilio kraepelini (Roewer, 1911)
 Dacnopilio quadridentatus Lawrence, 1965
 Dacnopilio scopulatus Lawrence, 1963

References

Harvestmen